Elder Lafayette White (December 23, 1933 – November 26, 2010) was an American professional baseball player who played 23 games (primarily as a shortstop) in the Major Leagues in  for the Chicago Cubs. Born in Colerain, North Carolina, he attended Chowan College.

White began the 1962 season on the Cubs' roster, and he started nine games at shortstop during the month of April, batting only .158 during the month. He later appeared in seven more games, starting five at shortstop, late in May and in early June.  Altogether, he collected eight hits in the Majors, including two doubles, and stole three bases.  He played 12 seasons of minor league baseball (1952; 1955–1965), with his most successful year also coming in 1962, when he batted .301 with 11 home runs for the Double-A San Antonio Missions.

References

External links

1933 births
2010 deaths
Amarillo Gold Sox players
Baseball players from North Carolina
Beaumont Pirates players
Chicago Cubs players
Chowan Hawks baseball players
Fargo-Moorhead Twins players
Fort Worth Cats players
Grand Forks Chiefs players
Knoxville Smokies players
Major League Baseball shortstops
Salt Lake City Bees players
San Antonio Missions players
Savannah Pirates players
Wilson Tobs players

https://www.baseball-almanac.com/players/player.php?p=whiteel02